The genus Proscyllium is a small genus of finback catsharks in the family Proscylliidae.

Species
 Proscyllium habereri Hilgendorf, 1904 (graceful catshark)
 Proscyllium magnificum Last & Vongpanich, 2004 (magnificent catshark)
 Proscyllium venustum S. Tanaka, 1912

 
Shark genera
Taxa named by Franz Martin Hilgendorf